The Bardhaman–Katwa line is a  broad gauge branch line connecting Bardhaman and Katwa in Purba Bardhaman district of West Bengal. It is under the jurisdiction of Eastern Railway. The line was a narrow gauge line, before its gauge conversion began on 2010. The gauge conversion was done in two phases along with electrification and the full broad gauge line was thrown open for public again on 12 January 2018.

History

McLeod's Light Railways
McLeod's Light Railways (MLR) consisted of four  narrow gauge lines in West Bengal in India. The railways were built and owned by McLeod & Company, which was the subsidiary of a London company of managing agents, McLeod Russell & Co. Ltd.

Burdwan-Katwa Railway connecting Bardhaman (earlier known as Burdwan) and Katwa in now Purba Bardhaman district, West Bengal was opened to traffic on 1 December 1915.

The engines chugged along at the maximum speed of 30 km per hour.

Gauge Conversion

The 53 km long railway section was converted to  broad gauge, work for which began on 15 April 2010.

The Bardhaman-Balogna section of the line, after conversion from narrow gauge to electrified broad gauge, was opened to the public on 11 February 2014. The Balogna-Katwa section of the line, after conversion from narrow gauge to electrified broad gauge, was opened to the public on 12 January 2018.

References

5 ft 6 in gauge railways in India
Rail transport in West Bengal

Transport in Asansol

Transport in Purba Bardhaman district